Biggs is an unincorporated community in Pike County, Kentucky, United States.

References

Unincorporated communities in Pike County, Kentucky
Unincorporated communities in Kentucky